The Whole Story is the second compilation album by English singer Kate Bush, and first greatest hits album worldwide. Released on 10 November 1986, it earned Bush her third UK number-one album and went on to become her best-selling release to date, being certified four-times platinum in the United Kingdom.

The album includes eleven of Bush's previous singles, with a previously unreleased track entitled "Experiment IV", which had been released as a single and reached the UK top 30. A newly recorded version of Bush's debut single "Wuthering Heights" (1978) opens the album. The album mix of "The Man with the Child in His Eyes" features on this album instead of the single version.

A home video compilation of the same name was released simultaneously, which includes the promotional videos for each song on the album.

In 2014, during Bush's Before the Dawn residency at the Hammersmith Apollo, The Whole Story charted at number 8 in the UK.

Following a resurgence of popularity for "Running Up That Hill (A Deal With God)" in 2022,  The Whole Story peaked at number 17 on the UK Albums Chart.

Track listing

LP, cassette and CD editions

VHS, VCD and Laserdisc editions

Personnel
 Kate Bush – keyboards, vocals, producer
 Ian Cooper – cutting engineer
 Jon Kelly – producer
 Andrew Powell – producer

Charts

Weekly charts

Year-end charts

Certifications and sales

Bibliography

References

1986 greatest hits albums
1986 video albums
Albums produced by Andrew Powell
Albums produced by Jon Kelly
EMI Records compilation albums
EMI Records video albums
Kate Bush albums
Kate Bush video albums
Music video compilation albums